The year 1963 was the 182nd year of the Rattanakosin Kingdom of Thailand. It was the 18th year in the reign of King Bhumibol Adulyadej (Rama IX), and is reckoned as year 2506 in the Buddhist Era.

Incumbents
King: Bhumibol Adulyadej 
Crown Prince: (vacant)
Prime Minister:
until 8 December: Sarit Thanarat 
starting 9 December: Thanom Kittikachorn
Supreme Patriarch: 
starting 4 May: Ariyavongsagatanana IV

Deaths
8 December - Field Marshal Sarit Thanarat, Thai Prime Minister

 
Years of the 20th century in Thailand
Thailand
Thailand
1960s in Thailand